The Benelli Nova is a pump action shotgun, used for hunting and self-defense. It has a one-piece receiver and buttstock, made of steel-reinforced polymer.

Technical specifications
Two main models are available as well as one variant.

Hunting 
This model is available with a variety of barrel and sight configurations, most intended for hunting and/or trap/skeet shooting. It is made in both Matte and camouflage finishes. Barrels may be rifled or smoothbore, and are usually 24", 26", or 28" long. This model is available in 12 gauge or 20 gauge. Five types of chokes are available. Typically sold with improved modified and full, internal chokes. extended aftermarket chokes available.

Tactical
This model is intended for defensive purposes. With an 18½" barrel, and rifle or ghost- ring (diopter) sights, it is easier to wield and quicker to sight than hunting models. This barrel is smoothbore, and not tapped for chokes, reducing its versatility and rendering it less accurate at longer ranges. This model is 12 gauge only.

Supernova 

This model incorporates a removable stock that can be replaced by a pistol-grip stock. This model has a bigger trigger set.

References

External links
 Manufacturer's Website

Benelli Armi SpA
Pump-action shotguns
Shotguns of Italy